Kuzminki District is a district of South-Eastern Administrative Okrug of the federal city of Moscow, Russia. Population:

History
The main point of interest in the district is the Vlakhernskoye-Kuzminki, a former estate of the Stroganov and Golitsyn families. In the 17th century, the territory of the modern district belonged to the Simon monastery. In 1702, Peter the Great gave this land to Grigory Dmitriyevich Stroganov.

Transportation
Two Moscow Metro stations are located in the district: Kuzminki and Volzhskaya.

References

External links
 History of Kuzminki District
 Local government in Kuzminki
Kuzminki - Photo Album - 310 photos and 113 digital paintings discovering the beauty of Kuzminki (Moscow, Russia) region.

South-Eastern Administrative Okrug
Districts of Moscow